The IS-2 (sometimes romanized as JS-2) is a Soviet heavy tank, the first of the IS tank series named after the Soviet leader Joseph Stalin. It was developed and saw combat during World War II and saw service in other Soviet allied countries after the war.

Design and production

Object 237 KV-85 and IS-85/IS-1 

The KV-1 was criticized by its crews for its poor mobility and the lack of a larger caliber gun than the T-34 medium tank. It was much more expensive than the T-34, without having greater combat performance. Moscow ordered some KV-1 assembly lines to shift to T-34 production, leading to fears that KV-1 production would be halted, and the SKB-2 design bureau, led by Kotin, closed. In 1942, this problem was partially addressed by the KV-1S tank, which had thinner armor than the original, making it lighter and faster. It was competitive with the T-34 but at the cost of no longer having the heavier armor. Production of the KV-1S was gradually replaced by the SU-152 and ended in April 1943.

The capture of a German Tiger tank in January 1943 led to a decision to develop a new heavy tank, which was given the codename Object 237. Before Object 237 had time to mature, intense tank fighting in the summer of 1943 demanded a response. The KV-85 was created by mounting an Object 237 turret on a KV-1S hull. To accommodate the Object 237 turret, the KV-1S hull was modified, increasing the diameter of the turret ring with fillets on the sides of the hull. The radio operator was replaced with an ammunition rack for the larger 85 mm ammunition. The hull MG was then moved to the opposite side of the driver and fixed in place to be operated by the driver. From September to October 1943, a total of 130 KV-85s were produced, before the assembly lines began to shift over. Like the KV-1S, the KV-85 served in dwindling numbers and was quickly overshadowed by the superior IS series.

The Object 237 prototype, a version of the cancelled KV-13, was accepted for production as the IS-85 heavy tank. First deliveries were made in October 1943, and the tanks went immediately into service. Production ended in January 1944. Its designation was simplified to IS-1 after the introduction of the IS-122, later renamed as IS-2 for security purposes.

Object 240 IS-2

Gun 
By 1943, engineers had succeeded in mounting the 85 mm gun to the T-34 medium tank, making it as well-armed as the KV-85 heavy tank. Efforts to up-gun the IS-85 began in late 1943. Two candidate weapons were the D-25 122 mm tank gun, the ballistic characteristics of which were identical to the A-19 122 mm gun, and the D-10 100 mm gun, which was based on a dual-purpose naval gun. The D-10 had been designed for anti-tank fire and had better armor penetration than the A-19, but the smaller caliber meant it had a less useful high explosive round. Also, the D-10 was a relatively new weapon in short supply, while there was excess production capacity for the A-19 and its ammunition. Compared to the older F-34 76.2 mm tank gun, the D-25 delivered 5.37 times the muzzle energy.

After testing both the D-25 and D-10 on the IS-122, the former was selected as the main armament of the new tank. The D-25 used a separate shell and powder charge, resulting in a lower rate of fire compared to the single-piece ammunition used in most tanks, a serious disadvantage in tank-to-tank engagements. It was therefore considered an adequate anti-tank gun. First deliveries of IS-122s mounted with this gun were in December 1943.

The side armour of the Panther was comparatively weaker and could be pentrated at  according to the same report. In 1944, the BR-471 was the sole armor-piercing round available. An improved version, the BR-471B was developed in spring 1945 but was available in quantity only after World War II ended.

However, in the summer of 1944, the Germans experienced a shortage of manganese and had to switch to using high-carbon steel alloyed with nickel, which made armor very brittle, especially at the seam welds. The performance of the 122 mm AP shells of the IS-2 against the Panther improved considerably. The reports from the front described cases where the BR-471 APHE round 122 mm projectile fired from  ricocheted off the front armor of a Panther, leaving huge breaches in it. According to Steven Zaloga, the IS-2 and Tiger I could knock each other out in normal combat distances below . At any range, the performance of each tank against each other was dependent on the crew and combat situation.

The large 122 mm HE shell was its main asset, proving highly useful and destructive as an infantry-killer. In extremis, the IS-2 engaged enemy heavy armor with OF-471 high explosive projectiles. The explosive power could blow off an enemy tank turret, drive sprocket and tread off the heaviest German tank even if it could not penetrate the armor. Mechanical shock and explosion was often enough to knock out enemy heavy tanks.

The most recognizable disadvantage of the D-25T gun was its slow rate of fire due to the large size and weight of the shells; only one to one and a half rounds per minute could be fired, initially. After some design improvements, including a semi-automatic drop breech over the previously manual screw breech, the rate of fire increased to 2–3 rounds per minute. According to other sources, the increase may have amounted to 3–4 rounds per minute. Another limitation imposed by the size of its ammunition in a relatively small vehicle was the ammunition stowage: only 28 rounds could be carried inside the tank, with a complement of 20 HE rounds, and 8 AP rounds the norm.

Protection 

The IS-2's armour was primarily composed from casting, which involves pouring molten metal into a mold and letting it cool. This method was done to reduce production costs and thus increase the number of vehicles that could be built (in contrast to its contemporary the Tiger II, which required significant machining in its construction). Casting also made it easier to vary the shape and thickness of the armour, which also reduced the exterior surface relative to tank volume. However, casting had to account for the metal shrinking as it cooled (becoming denser) and with limitations on Soviet casting technology, IS-2 armour thickness could vary even when produced from the same mold. Lower-quality alloys had to sometimes be used, substituting manganese for nickel, meaning that while the armour had high hardness and resisted penetration better than steel, it was also quite brittle and thus at risk of shattering.

Production 
The IS-122 prototype replaced the IS-85 and began mass production as the IS-2. The 85 mm guns could be reserved for the new T-34-85 medium tank and some of the IS-1s built were rearmed before leaving the factory and issued as IS-2s. It was slightly lighter and faster than the heaviest KV model 1942 tank, with thicker front armor and a much-improved turret design. The tank could carry thicker armor than the KV series, while remaining lighter, due to the better layout of the armor envelope. The KV's armor was less well-shaped and featured heavy armor even on the rear, while the IS series concentrated its armor at the front. The IS-2 was slightly heavier than the Panther, much lighter than the Tiger I and Tiger II and had a lower silhouette than both. Western observers tended to criticize Soviet tanks for their lack of finish and crude construction. The Soviets argued that it was warranted, considering the need for wartime expediency and the typically short battlefield life of their tanks.

Early IS-2s can be identified by the 'stepped' front hull casting with its small, opening driver's visor. The early tanks lacked gun tube travel locks or anti-aircraft-capable machine guns and had narrow mantlets.

In late 1944, the stepped hull front was replaced with an improved single casting of 120 mm thickness angled at 60 degrees. This new nose lacked the opening driver's visor. It is sometimes incorrectly referred to as the IS-2M, but that designation actually refers to a much later modernization program from the 1950s. Other minor upgrades included the addition of a travel lock on the hull rear, wider mantlet and, on very late models, an anti-aircraft machine gun. However, the model 1944 did not fully replace the model 1943.

In comparison to the Tiger I, the IS-2 had modest advantages in armour, even though it was 10 tons lighter. In 1944, the latter was the only large-scale Allied tank whose armor provided some protection from the well-known Tiger 88mm long-barreled guns and Panther 75mm L/70 guns.

In the mid-1950s, the remaining IS-2 tanks (mostly model 1944 variants although several model 1943 variants) were upgraded to the IS-2M standard, which introduced fittings such as external fuel tanks on the rear hull (the basic IS-2 had these only on the hull sides), stowage bins on both sides of the hull and protective skirting along the top edges of the tracks.

Combat history 
The IS-2 tank first saw combat in early 1944, equipping elite Guards Heavy Tank Regiments of the Red Army. A regiment had 21 IS-2 tanks in four companies of five tanks each and one being used by the regimental commander. The special tank regiments were reserved for important attacks, often to spearhead attempts to break through fortified German positions like anti-tank defence lines and bunkers. The tanks supported infantry in the assault by destroying bunkers, buildings, dug-in weapons and engaging German armoured vehicles. Once a breakthrough was achieved, lighter and more mobile tanks were used for exploitation and mopping-up. The IS-2 tank first saw action in Ukraine in early 1944 and claimed to have destroyed more than forty Tigers and Elefants for the loss of only eight tanks. While the German heavy tanks could knock out the IS-2, they had no real answer to its  gun, which easily outgunned them.

Oględów 
On the morning of 11 August 1944, the 16th Panzer Division attacked the 53rd Guards Tank Brigade reinforced by the 71st Independent Guards Heavy Tank Regiment in the town of Oględów, toward Staszów. The extremely sandy terrain forced the eleven King Tigers to keep to the roads, whilst the defending Soviet forces positioned their tanks and assault guns in ambush positions and concentrated on the known German avenues of approach. Later in the day, Soviet forces counter-attacked and seized the town of Oględów and found three abandoned Tiger IIs. The capture of these tanks allowed the Soviets to conduct tests at Kubinka and to evaluate its strengths and weaknesses.

Over the next two days the Red Army advanced on Staszów and in several counterattacks, 501st Heavy Panzer Battalion lost seven more Tiger IIs. Virtually all of these were destroyed by Soviet tanks occupying a defensive position. In three days of fighting, Soviet forces destroyed or captured 14 of 30 Tiger IIs for about the same number of Soviet IS-2s and T-34s.

Post World War II 
By the 1950s, the emergence of the main battle tank concept—combining medium-tank mobility with the firepower and armor of the heavy tank—had rendered heavy tanks obsolete. In the late 1960s the remaining Soviet heavy tanks were transferred to Red Army reserve service and storage. The IS-2 Model 1944 remained in service much longer in the armies of Cuba, China and North Korea. A regiment of Chinese IS-2s was available for use in the Korean War but saw no service there.

After the Korean War, China attempted to reverse-engineer the IS-2/IS-3 as the Type 122 medium tank. The project was cancelled in favor of the Type 59, a copy of the Soviet T-54A.

Variants 
KV-85 (Object 239) A stopgap model built from a modified KV-1S hull mated to an Object 237(IS-1)'s turret and armed with the 85 mm D-5T. An alternate prototype designated KV-85G (for Grabin, who designed S-31 gun) or Object 238, which had 85 mm S-31 mounted in normal KV-1s tank existed but proved inferior to normal KV-85 and never reached production.
IS-85 (IS-1) 1943 model armed with an 85 mm gun. When IS-2 production started, many were re-gunned with 122 mm guns before being issued.
IS-100 Two prototype versions armed with different 100 mm guns, IS-4/Object 245 with D-10T and IS-5/Object 248 with S-34; it went into trials against the IS-122 which was armed with a 122 mm gun. Though the IS-100 was reported to have better anti-armor capabilities, the latter was chosen due to better all-around performance.
IS-122 (IS-2 model 1943) 1943 model, earlier tanks were armed with early version of 122 mm D-25T gun with interrupted screw breech and different muzzle brake (strongly tapering towards end, similar to ones found on most German tanks), later used standard version of D-25T with falling block breech and pear-shaped muzzle brake.
IS-2 model 1944 (sometimes referred as "IS-2m")1944 improvement with improved simpler hull front. Armored hulls were produced by No.200 plant (cast) and UZTM (welded) simultaneously. added a 12.7mm machine gun on top.
IS-2M 1957 (although received IS-2M index only in 1960) technological modernization of pre-existing IS-2 tanks. New hull sides with integrated stowage boxes, T-10M tracks and roadwheels, machine gun in turret rear replaced by ventilation fan and many other minor technical improvements.

Operators

 People's Liberation Army: 60 IS-2s delivered in 1950–1951. Operated during the Korean War and in concrete bunkers along the Sino-Soviet border.

 Cuban Army: 41 IS-2Ms delivered in 1960.

 Czechoslovak Army: 8 IS-2/IS-2M in service between 1945-1960.

 NVA: 60 IS-2 delivered 1956. Operated until 1963.

 Wehrmacht: Captured one or two IS-2 in May 1945.

 Hungarian People's Army: At least one IS-1 captured during the World War II, and 68 IS-2s in service between 1950-1956. After the crackdown of the Hungarian Revolution of 1956 all were returned to the Soviet Union.

 Korean People's Army: Small number of IS-2s; unknown number deployed in combat in the Korean War. Remains both active and reserve within the KPA.

 Polish Land Forces: Approximately 71 IS-2s used in combat between 1944-1945. 180 IS-2s survived as of 1955 and remained in service until the 1960s; some later were converted to armoured recovery vehicles.

 Romanian Land Forces: At least one IS-2 captured during May–June 1944. Two armored recovery vehicles based on the IS-2 chassis were received by 1 January 1956.

 South Ossetian Army: Operated some IS-2s until 1995.

 Red Army: Heavy Breakthrough Tank from 1944-1945.
 Soviet Army: Phased out of service in the early-1970s. Completely withdrawn both 1943 and 1944 model variants in 1995.

Surviving vehicles

There are several surviving IS-1 and IS-2 tanks, with examples found at the following:
 IS-2
 Os. Górali [standing tank], Kraków, Poland
 Polish Army Museum, Warsaw, Poland
 Museum of Arms in Fort Winiary, Poznań, Poland
 Museum of Armoured Weapon in Training Center of Land Forces, Poznań, Poland (operational, see movie)
 Tank Museum of the People's Liberation Army, Beijing, China.
 Liberty Park, Overloon, The Netherlands.
 Museum of The History of Ukraine in World War II, Ukraine (five IS-2M, one of them is crudely modified with spare D-10T gun and labeled as IS-1)
 Kurzeme Fortress Museum, Zante, Latvia.
 Diorama Battle of Kursk, in Belgorod, Russia.
 The American Heritage Museum, Stow, Massachusetts, USA
 Army Technical Museum, Lešany, Czech Republic (previously in Prague as a Monument to Soviet tank crews)
 IS-2M
 Imperial War Museum Duxford, England.
 Kubinka Tank Museum, Russia.
 Victory Park at Poklonnaya Gora, Moscow, Russia.

Notes

References

Sources 

 
 
 
 
 
 
 
 

Heavy tanks of the Soviet Union
Military vehicles introduced from 1940 to 1944